Badri Hosseini Khamenei is a sister of Ayatollah Ali Khamenei. 

In 1985,  in the middle of the Iraq-Iran war, she illegally left Iran with her children and fled to Iraq. She did so to join her husband, Sheik Ali Tehrani, after a one-year separation. She admitted later that 20 of her friends were arrested and executed by the regime.

In 1995, she returned to Iran, but remains alienated from Ali Khamenei. 

In December 2022, amid Mahsa Amini protests, she criticized her brother's rule and his "despotic caliphate". In an open letter, she also hoped to see him overthrown. "The regime of the Islamic Republic of Khomeini and Ali Khamenei has brought nothing but suffering and oppression to Iran and Iranians," she wrote.

Family
Badri Khamenei's husband was Ali Tehrani (1926–2022), an Iranian Shia Islamic theologian and writer. He fled to Iraq in 1984. After returning to Iran, he spent 10 years in prison. 

Her daughter, Farideh Moradkhani, the supreme leader’s niece, was arrested in November 2022 after going to a prosecutor’s office following a summons.

Her son Mahmoud Moradkhani is based in France and was the one shared both his sister's video criticizing the regime and their mother's criticism of the regime in December 2022.

References

Ali Khamenei
21st-century Iranian women
Living people
Mahsa Amini protests
Date of birth missing (living people)
Year of birth missing (living people)
Place of birth missing (living people)